Interstate 64 (I-64) passes through the Greater St. Louis area in the US state of Missouri. The entire route overlaps U.S. Route 40 (US 40). Because the road was a main thoroughfare in the St. Louis area before the development of the Interstate Highway System, it is not uncommon for locals to refer to the stretch of highway as "Highway 40" rather than "I-64". On December 6, 2009, the portion of the highway running through the city of St. Louis was named the Jack Buck Memorial Highway in honor of the late sportscaster.

Route description
I-64 begins at an interchange with I-70, US 40, and US 61 in St. Charles County and heads south. Previously, the freeway was a divided highway signed only as US 40 with at-grade intersections, which were slowly converted to limited-access exits. The final intersection at Callahan Road was removed on October 14, 2009. The next major exit is for Route N and the western terminus of Route 364. Route 364 was completed and opened on November 2, 2014. From here, I-64 continues past interchanges with Route DD/Winghaven Boulevard, Route 94, and Research Park Circle and then crosses the Missouri River via the Daniel Boone Bridge and enters St. Louis County.

The freeway travels through the congested Chesterfield Valley, where it gains a fourth lane and then meets I-270 at a flyover interchange built in the early 1990s in the city of Town and Country. Continuing east, I-64 remains four lanes and travels through the affluent areas of Frontenac and Ladue. The next major interchange is I-170 in the city of Richmond Heights. This stretch, located between Ballas Road and I-170, was closed in 2008 for a complete reconstruction, at which point substandard exits were upgraded and the fourth lane was added. The interchange with I-170 was also overhauled, creating a full interchange with highspeed ramps in all directions. The reconstructed expressway opened to traffic on the morning of December 15, 2008.

East of the interchange with I-170, I-64 drops a lane and stays at three throughlanes to Clayton Road. Through here, the expressway passes through older neighborhoods and enters into the city of St. Louis. After readding a fourth lane, the freeway skirts the southern edge of Forest Park. In this area, one finds both the Saint Louis Science Center and Saint Louis Zoo. Kingshighway marks the end of the completely reconstructed eastern half, where again outdated exits were updated and shoulders widened. The eastern half was closed from December 15, 2008, to December 7, 2009. Passing by Saint Louis University, the freeway becomes double-decked for the first time (eastbound lanes at a lower level; westbound lanes at an upper one), gaining back a fourth lane east of Compton Avenue. Another lane drop occurs at the Chestnut and 20th Street exit, where the canceled Route 755 was to interchange. The freeway passes just south of the Enterprise Center and again becomes double-decked in the same arrangement, passing within  of the New Busch Stadium. The route becomes two lanes as it approaches the Mississippi River and the Poplar Street Bridge, where it is intersects I-55 and I-44 at an incomplete interchange; it was also at this interchange that I-70 joined I-55 and I-64 to cross the Poplar Street Bridge, but its former downtown route is now an extension of I-44. Eastbound I-64 cannot directly access either one of the other routes, but westbound I-64, however, can directly access both. I-64 continues into Illinois concurrent with I-55; until 2014, it also ran concurrent with I-70, which has since been rerouted onto the Stan Musial Veterans Memorial Bridge further upstream.

History

Initial construction
Before the Interstate Highway System, US 40 was a main thoroughfare through St. Louis and Kansas City. From each state line, there were signs saying "Future I-55/I-64 Corridor" and "Future I-70 Corridor".

Reconstruction
The Missouri Department of Transportation (MoDOT) rebuilt the stretch of I-64 from Spoede Road to Kingshighway Boulevard between 2008 and 2009. The project included new concrete pavement on the highway; approximately 25 rebuilt bridges; and several reconfigured interchanges, including a new freeway-to-freeway interchange at I-170.

The section between Spoede Road and I-170 was closed for reconstruction on January 2, 2008, and opened to traffic on December 15, 2008. The section between I-170 and Kingshighway Boulevard was closed on December 15, 2008, and reopened to traffic on December 7, 2009. The project was completed with a dedication and opening day ceremony on Sunday, December 6. In 2020, exits 39 and 38B were closed and demolished to make way for the St. Louis MLS Stadium on the site.

Exit list

See also

References

External links

 Missouri Department of Transportation: The New I-64

64
Roads in Greater St. Louis
Transportation in St. Charles County, Missouri
Transportation in St. Louis County, Missouri
1956 establishments in Missouri
 Missouri